The 1972 USAC Championship Car season consisted of ten races, beginning in Avondale, Arizona on March 18 and concluding at the same location on November 4.  The USAC National Champion was Joe Leonard and the Indianapolis 500 winner was Mark Donohue. Jim Malloy was killed at Indianapolis in practice; he was 40 years old.

After sponsoring the USAC Championship Trail in 1970-1971, Marlboro dropped out of the sport for 1972. After only two seasons as title sponsor, the company became angered when rival Viceroy was signed on to sponsor Vel's Parnelli Jones Racing, at the time dubbed the "super team" of the series. Without any exclusivity clause, managers at Marlboro deemed the situation "impractical and untenable," and abruptly quit. Marlboro would not return to Indy car racing until 1986.

Schedule and results

All races running on Oval/Speedway.

 Originally scheduled for July 2, postponed because of rain.

In the fall of 1971, a tentative schedule held the possibility of returning road courses to the championship schedule. Races at Colorado, Donnybrook, Bridgehampton, Road Atlanta, Mosport, as well as a return to Rafaela, Argentina, and a new "Florida 500" at the proposed "Florida International Raceway", were all part of an early press release. However, all road courses were ultimately left off, the Argentina race was discontinued, and the Florida race course was never built.

Final points standings

Note: Peter Revson is not eligible for points.

References

 
 
 
 
 http://media.indycar.com/pdf/2011/IICS_2011_Historical_Record_Book_INT6.pdf  (p. 228-229)

See also
 1972 Indianapolis 500

USAC Championship Car season
USAC Championship Car
1972 in American motorsport